Raja Ka Tal is a reservoir built by Senapati, the grandson of Maharaja Chhatrasal, in 1707. It is locally known as Bara Tal. 

This town is located to National Highway 19(India). The population of this town is more than 10000.   

All modern facilities are available in Raja Ka Tal.

Connectivity NH 19 and Agra to distance 35 km. Yamuna Expressway 25 km 

And connect to the Indian railway.Howrah–Delhi main line 

This town has the largest   Glass production manufacturer Industry.. the work Export from  All Over the World countries.

The palace of the king - Raja's rhythm is located about 2 km away from Hirangan, the king's rhythm was constructed by the Firozabad Gajat by Raja Todramal, one of the Navratanas of Samrat Akbar, who was made by the Red Stone on the banks of the Agra road. The rhythm remembers Lord Todarmal, an interesting fact about this rhythm is that there is a stone made of stone in the middle of the rhythm, which is reached by a dam bridge Maybe, but currently, it looks as wall nominal longer rhythm nominal and it has become the most houses but red Kakri to somewhere. 

This Village is descendants of the Family of Aath-Pariya (Zamindar)

Firozabad
Lakes of Uttar Pradesh